Movistar Team is a professional road bicycle racing women's team which participates in elite women's races. The title sponsor is the Spanish mobile telephone company Telefónica, with the team riding under the name of the company's brand Movistar.

History

In the same week Rachel Neylan was added to the line-up. In November Movistar announced their final tenth rider addition to the 2018 roster, from Lointek, Gloria Rodríguez.

Team roster

Major results

2018
 Valencian rider classification Semana Ciclista Valenciana, Alba Teruel
Trofeo Roldan, Gloria Rodríguez
Vuelta a Murcia, Gloria Rodríguez
Balmaseda, Eider Merino
Gran Premio Muniadona, Lourdes Oyarbide
2019
 Mountains classification Tour de Yorkshire Women's Race, Mavi Garcia
Stage 4 Vuelta a Burgos Feminas, Lourdes Oyarbide
Team classification Emakumeen Euskal Bira
2020 
La Périgord Ladies, Sheyla Gutiérrez
2021
 Young rider classification Healthy Ageing Tour, Emma Norsgaard Jørgensen
Dwars door Vlaanderen, Annemiek van Vleuten
Tour of Flanders, Annemiek van Vleuten
 Overall Ceratizit Festival Elsy Jacobs, Emma Norsgaard Jørgensen
Stages 1 & 2, Emma Norsgaard Jørgensen
 Overall Setmana Ciclista Valenciana, Annemiek van Vleuten 
Stage 1, Annemiek van Vleuten
Emakumeen Nafarroako Klasikoa, Annemiek van Vleuten
Stage 1 Thüringen Rundfahrt der Frauen, Emma Norsgaard Jørgensen
Stage 6 Giro Rosa, Emma Norsgaard Jørgensen
 Olympic Time Trial, Annemiek van Vleuten
San Sebastián, Annemiek van Vleuten
 Overall Ladies Tour of Norway, Annemiek van Vleuten
Stage 3, Annemiek van Vleuten
 Overall Challenge by La Vuelta, Annemiek van Vleuten
Stages 2 (ITT) & 3, Annemiek van Vleuten
 Overall Tour Cycliste Féminin International de l'Ardèche, Leah Thomas
Stage 2, Leah Thomas
2022
 Overall Setmana Ciclista Valenciana, Annemiek van Vleuten
Stage 3, Annemiek van Vleuten
Omloop Het Nieuwsblad, Annemiek van Vleuten
Le Samyn, Emma Norsgaard Jørgensen
Liège–Bastogne–Liège, Annemiek van Vleuten
Stages 1 & 2 Vuelta Ciclista Andalucia Ruta Del Sol, Arlenis Sierra
Emakumeen Nafarroako Women's Elite Classics, Sarah Gigante
 Overall Giro d'Italia Donne, Annemiek van Vleuten
Stages 4 & 8, Annemiek van Vleuten
 Overall Tour de France Femmes, Annemiek van Vleuten
Stages 7 & 8, Annemiek van Vleuten 
 Overall Challenge by La Vuelta, Annemiek van Vleuten
Stage 2, Annemiek van Vleuten 
2023
Vuelta a la Comunitat Valenciana Feminas, Floortje Mackaij

National, continental and world champions

2018
 France Road Race, Aude Biannic
 Poland Time Trial, Małgorzata Jasińska
 Spain Time Trial, Margarita Victoria Garcia
 Spain Under-23 Time Trial, Alba Teruel
 Poland Road Race, Małgorzata Jasińska
 Spain Road Race, Eider Merino
2019
 Spain Time Trial, Sheyla Gutiérrez
2020
 Norway Time Trial, Katrine Aalerud
2021
 Olympic Time Trial, Annemiek van Vleuten
 Denmark Time Trial, Emma Norsgaard
 Norway Time Trial, Katrine Aalerud
 Serbia Road Race, Jelena Erić
2022
 World Road Race, Annemiek van Vleuten
 Panamerican Road Race, Arlenis Sierra
 Denmark Time Trial, Emma Norsgaard
 Serbia Road Race, Jelena Erić

References

External links

UCI Women's Teams
Cycling teams based in Spain
Cycling teams established in 2017
Telefónica